Sri Kaliswari College is housed in a  campus in a three-storied Palatial Building on the Sivakasi Virudhunagar Highway, about 7 km from Sivakasi.

Sri Kaliswari College is an Arts and Science college in South India.
It has been established by the trust of the fireworks, safety matches, pyrotechnics, metal powder industries etc., Sri Kaliswari Group of Industries, Sivakasi.

The college, which was started with just three courses in the year 2000–2001, now has 12 Under Graduate courses, 6 Post Graduate Courses and two Research Programmes affiliated to Madurai Kamaraj University.

Separate hostels for men and women with modern amenities are available in the campus. A mineral water plant is installed for drinking water. Frequent buses are available from both Virudhunagar and Sivakasi to the College. To bring the students from Virudhunagar, Srivilliputtur, Rajapalayam, Sattur, Vembakottai and Sivakasi, the college has owned a large number of buses.

To begin with, the college was housed temporarily in Sivakasi town in 2000–2001 with three  courses. The college moved  to  new  premises  on  19 March 2001.

References

External links
Official website

Colleges affiliated to Madurai Kamaraj University
Education in Virudhunagar district
Educational institutions established in 2000
2000 establishments in Tamil Nadu